A list of the works by or about music critic Alex Ross.

Books
 
 
 
 
Chapters

Essays and reporting

1993–2009

2010–2014
 
 
 
 
 
 
 
 
 
 
 
 
 
 
 
 
 
 
 
 
 
 
 
 
 
 
 
 
 
 
 
 
  Steven Schick.

2015–2019
 
 
 
  Jordi Savall.
 
 
 
  David Lang.

2020–

Critical studies and reviews of Ross' work
Wagnerism

Notes

External links
 

Bibliographies by writer
Bibliographies of American writers